Đồng Tâm may refer to several places in Vietnam, including:

Đồng Tâm, Hai Bà Trưng  District, a ward of Hai Bà Trưng District, Hanoi
Đồng Tâm, Vĩnh Phúc, a ward of Vĩnh Yên
Đồng Tâm, Yên Bái, a ward of Yên Bái
Đồng Tâm, Bắc Kạn, a township and capital of Chợ Mới District, Bắc Kạn
Đồng Tâm, Mỹ Đức, a rural commune of Mỹ Đức District, Hanoi
Đồng Tâm, Bắc Giang, a rural commune of Yên Thế District
Đồng Tâm, Bình Phước, a rural commune of Đồng Phú District
Đồng Tâm, Hà Giang, a rural commune of Bắc Quang District
Đồng Tâm, Hải Dương, a rural commune of Ninh Giang District
Đồng Tâm, Hòa Bình, a rural commune of Lạc Thủy District
Đồng Tâm, Quảng Ninh, a rural commune of Bình Liêu District

See also
Đồng Tâm Base Camp